Naked Campus is a 1982 drama film directed by Robert E. Morris and starring Peter Knight Silander and Robert Dryer.

It looks into the aspects and views of a small group of students, as they come across various life issues.

Cast
Peter Knight Silander as Mike
Robert Dryer as John
Robin Shepherd as Greg
Julie Marine as Peggy
Gail Thompson-Kindler as Laura
Lee Arnone as Susan
Don Conreaux as Mike's Father
Ransom Roberts as Mike's Mother
Bob Anderson as Greg's Father
Joan Brenner as Greg's Mother
Victor Swift as Vic Calhoun
W.W. Cass as J. S. Fitch
Ray Finks as Roomie
Irene Firstein as Sunflower
Jim Pettyjohn as Jim

External links

 

1982 films
1982 drama films
American drama films
1980s English-language films
1980s American films